David Brad Phillips (born 28 October 1977) is a former New Zealand gymnast. He won a bronze medal at the 1998 Commonwealth Games in the men's floor exercise.

He competed at the 2000 Summer Olympics in several events.

References

External links 
 
 
 
 

Olympic gymnasts of New Zealand
New Zealand male artistic gymnasts
Commonwealth Games bronze medallists for New Zealand
Gymnasts at the 1998 Commonwealth Games
Gymnasts at the 2000 Summer Olympics
1977 births
Living people
Commonwealth Games medallists in gymnastics
Medallists at the 1998 Commonwealth Games